Mantidactylus brevipalmatus is a species of frog in the family Mantellidae.
It is endemic to Madagascar.
Its natural habitats are subtropical or tropical moist montane forests, subtropical or tropical high-altitude grassland, rivers, swamps, pastureland, and heavily degraded former forest.

References

brevipalmatus
Endemic frogs of Madagascar
Taxonomy articles created by Polbot
Amphibians described in 1929